The Lay of Thrym is the sixth full-length album by the Faroese Viking/folk metal band Týr. The name of the album comes from one of the best known poems from the Poetic Edda, called "Þrymskviða", "The Lay of Thrym". The band revealed the name of the album along with its release date on their MySpace page. The cover artwork is by Gyula Havancsák. This would be the band's last album with long-time drummer Kári Streymoy.

Track listing

References

2011 albums
Týr (band) albums
Napalm Records albums